The Scottish Six Days Trial is an internationally recognised Motorcycle trials competition, which has been running since 1909 (with breaks for the two world wars) making it the oldest motorcycle trials event in the world. Motorcycle riders from all over the world compete in this extreme sport, covering as much as 100 miles a day on road and off-road routes around Lochaber on each of the six days. The event is a trial of the skill, consistency and endurance of the riders, as well as a test of the specialised motorcycles used.

History
The inaugural Scottish motorcycle trial was held in July 1909 and was a five-day event devised by Campbell McGregor of the Edinburgh Motor Cycle Club.

Originally, the trial started in Edinburgh, going to John O'Groats before returning to Edinburgh. It aimed to be the most challenging motorcycle trial ever held. The Edinburgh & District Club organised the event from 1911. Prior to that event the organisers were a combination of local clubs in the Edinburgh area.

By 1912 the event was known as the "Scottish Six Days Open Reliability Trial" and by 1914 rules were agreed together with a marking system and time penalties for machine faults. The outbreak of the First World War halted competition but the Six Days Trial returned in 1919. Problems with following the route were solved by marking the course with yellow ochre from a barrel mounted on a car (a system which stayed in place until the mid-1970s, when the present system of marker arrows and orange flags for off-road sections was introduced). The scoring system was updated in 1926 to allow for condition, hillclimbing and brake testing but the event was still a test of motorcycle reliability.

From the 1930s factory teams became more prevalent and in 1932 the results system was further amended to identify an outright winner. In 1938, Fort William was chosen as the central point of the trial although, it still started and ended in Edinburgh. The outbreak of World War II stopped competition until 1947, when 108 competitors took part.

In 1977, the event broke its link with Edinburgh and the event started and finished in Fort William. This was due to the Gathering of the Clans taking up a sizeable amount of accommodation in the Capital. The organisers were forced to move the start and finish to Fort William, but it proved very popular move, as it assisted the logistics of the trial for both competitors and officials. During the 1970s and 1980s, the Scottish Six Days Trial grew in popularity and was established as the most important event for trials motorcycles.

The club
The Edinburgh & District Motor Club Ltd is based in Edinburgh and was formed through the amalgamation of several Edinburgh based motor clubs in 1911. The headquarters of the Edinburgh & District Motor Club Ltd and hence the SSDT was at 28 Nelson Street, Edinburgh until 2001 when the premises were sold for redevelopment. It is the recognised organisation responsible body for the Scottish Six Days Trial. The club decided to celebrate 100 years of the event in 2011, this resulted in a massive over-subscription of the trial. Since the 1940s the event has been known as "A Sporting Holiday in The Highlands" but in reality it is a truly competitive event.

The 1950s and 1960s
Over the years particular makes of machine appear to have dominated the trial. One such make was the AJS. Manufactured by Associated Motor Cycles (AMC) in Plumstead, South East London, England, the rugged and reliable AJS Model 16 was considered ideal for the demands of the Scottish Trial, with modifications including upgrading the frame to a welded duplex tubular frame with an engine cradle to reduce weight and redesigned exhaust and footrests to improve ground clearance. In 1957 it was further redesigned to increase clearance from 7 inches to 10 inches. Hugh Viney led the AJS works team in the post war years and won the challenging 1947 Trial on an AJS 16MC at his first attempt – then repeated the achievement the following year and made it three in a row in 1949. In the 1950s this record was beaten by another AJS Works Team rider Gordon Jackson, who won the Scottish four times, in the 1961 event he won the trial losing only one mark. The SSDT, up until 1976, started on the Monday morning from the Gorgie Cattle Market (Now called 'The Corn Exchange') and finished on the Saturday at the Observatory at Blackford Hill, Edinburgh. The event being based at Fort William during the week.

Present day
The "Scottish" has been completely based at Fort William since the 1977 event and is so popular that there are usually over 500 entries for the 275 places available. Of the 275 places, 30 are reserved for factory teams and a further 50 for allocation by the club. The remaining places are allocated through a ballot system. Following a period of private refuelling services and the increase in health and safety regulations, the British Army were invited and made use of the SSDT as a live refuelling exercise called 'Operation Highland Trot'. The future of the SSDT was put into temporary jeopardy in 2003 when the Army reluctantly announced in late 2002 that they were no longer able to provide a refuelling service. However, the SSDT was able to continue through 2003 with another branch of the Army taking over the refuelling services. Since the 1960s it has been customary for a Scotsman to be allocated the riding number 1. The trial celebrated its 'Official Centenary' in 2011, 100 years since the 1911 event, which was the first organised by the Edinburgh & District Motor Club Ltd. The majority of the event takes place on private ground, connected by public highway. Following the event by motorcycle on private land is strictly prohibited, as permission for the competitors and officials is only granted under this caveat. Spectators at observed sections are welcome, but those spectating are asked to park sensibly at or near sections. Observing these requirements will thus ensure the future of this prestigious event. The trial organisers work very closely with landowners and government agencies to ensure that the environment is protected during not only the event itself, but the preparations prior to it on an annual basis.

SSDT winners

(No outright winners were identifiable prior to 1932)

See also
 Scott Trial
 FIM Trial World Championship

References

External links
 The official SSDT web site
 2006 winner Graham Jarvis
 2007 winner James Dabill
 2014 winner Dougie Lampkin
 Video of 2002 SSDT competition

Motorcycle trials
Motorcycle races
Motorsport in Scotland
Motorsport competitions in the United Kingdom
1909 establishments in Scotland
Fort William, Highland
Sport in Highland (council area)
Recurring sporting events established in 1909